Greatest Days is an upcoming British film based on the Take That jukebox musical of the same name (originally titled The Band), directed by Coky Giedroyc and written by Tim Firth. The film is scheduled to be released in summer 2023.

Cast

Production
Producing the film are Danny Perkins, Kate Solomon and Jane Hooks. Executive producers include Take That themselves, Damian Jones of DJ Films, Tobias Gutzwiller of SPG3, David Pugh and Dafydd Rogers who produced the original musical, and Joe Naftalin.

In March 2022, it was announced Aisling Bea would star in the film alongside Alice Lowe, Amaka Okafor, Jayde Adams, Marc Wootton, Matthew McNulty, Lara McDonnell, Jessie Mae Alonzo, Nandi Sawyers-Hudson, Carragon Guest, and Eliza Dobson. Aaron Bryan, Dalvin Cory, Joshua Jung, Mark Samaras and Mervin Noronha would make up the film's fictional boy band.

Principal photography took place in Clitheroe, Lancashire in April 2022 before moving to Athens.

References

External links
 

Upcoming films
2023 films
British musical films
Films based on musicals
Films shot in Lancashire
Jukebox musical films